"Lady Picture Show" is a song by American alternative rock band Stone Temple Pilots. It was the second single released from their third album, Tiny Music... Songs from the Vatican Giftshop. It was one of three tracks on this album to reach #1 on the Billboard Hot Mainstream Rock Tracks chart.

The song, Scott Weiland writes in his autobiography Not Dead and Not For Sale, "is about the horrific gang rape of a dancer who winds up falling in love but can't let go of the pain."

"Lady Picture Show" also appears on Thank You, a greatest hits compilation released in 2003. It was also used in the unaired pilot episode of Buffy the Vampire Slayer during the scene where Buffy is at The Bronze.

Composition
The song is known for its striking resemblance to the style of music which was popular in the 1970s. It consists of a memorable opening riff, heavy use of the bass, as well as the use of a concert bass drum during the main chorus. The album (and this song especially) represents a milestone in STP's sound, for a large amount of psychedelic rock can be heard throughout the album. Scott Weiland's trademark low growl was replaced with a higher croon.

Music video

The music video was directed by Josh Taft. The video is presented as an old film peep show; rendered nearly completely in black-and-white. Throughout the video, the band can be seen playing in a white room, with objects such as bubbles and shiny diamonds. Various shots of exotic dancers are seen dancing around the screen as well, along with shots of the band members playing. During Dean DeLeo's notable solo, the screen turns into the fuzzy color structure which was a trademark of the 1960s. The segment shows Dean playing in a colorful meadow, and then the video then fades back into black and white for the rest of the video.

Charts

Notes

1996 singles
Stone Temple Pilots songs
Song recordings produced by Brendan O'Brien (record producer)
Songs written by Robert DeLeo
Songs written by Scott Weiland
1996 songs